Anne-Christine Davis is a British theoretical physicist at the University of Cambridge. She was the first woman to be appointed a professor in the Faculty of Mathematics at the University. Her research mainly concerns cosmology, astrophysics and string theory.

Davis was a graduate student at Bristol University, under the supervision of W. Noel Cottingham. She obtained her doctorate in 1975. Following postdoctoral positions at Durham University and Imperial College London, Davis worked overseas at CERN in Geneva, Switzerland (where she became the first female theoretician) and at the Institute for Advanced Study in Princeton. Since 1983 she has held positions at DAMTP, Cambridge, and King's College, Cambridge. From 2002–2013 she was Professor of Theoretical Physics at DAMTP and from 2013–2018 she held the "Professorship of Mathematical Physics (1967)". She has been a member of the General Board and the Council of the University of Cambridge.

Davis' recent work has focused on particle cosmology, in particular investigating the chameleon theory and its relation to f(R) theory.

Early life

Davis first became interested in science at the age of five. 

She then became the only woman at her school to pursue A-levels in mathematics, physics, and chemistry.

Positions by year

 2014 University Gender Equality Champion for STEMM subjects
 2013–2018 Professor of Mathematical Physics (1967), DAMTP, Cambridge University
 2002-2013 Professor of Theoretical Physics, DAMTP, Cambridge University
 1996-2000 Reader in Theoretical Physics, DAMTP
 1995-1996 ADR—DAMTP
 1988-1995 College Teaching Officer, Kings College Cambridge
 1983-1988 Research Council Advanced Fellow, DAMTP Cambridge University
 1982-1983 Institute for Advanced Study, Princeton, USA
 1980-1982 Fellow, Theory Division, CERN, Geneva
 1978-1980 Postdoctoral research associate in theoretical physics, Blackett Physics Laboratory Imperial College, London
 1976-1978 Postdoctoral research associate in theoretical physics, Mathematics Department, Durham University

Recognition
In 2009 she was elected to the Academia Europaea.
In 2019 she won the Institute of Physics Richard Glazebrook Medal and Prize.

References

British physicists
Theoretical physicists
Living people
Alumni of the University of Bristol
Cambridge mathematicians
Year of birth missing (living people)
People associated with CERN
Members of Academia Europaea